The Bundesstraße 73 or B73 is a German federal highway running in a northwesterly to southeasterly direction from Cuxhaven  to Hamburg.  It runs partially beside the Bundesautobahn 26.

External links 

073
B07
B073